Lior Attar, better known simply as Lior, is an independent Australian singer-songwriter based in Melbourne. He is best known for his 2005 debut studio album Autumn Flow and for the song "Hoot's Lullaby".

Early life and education
Lior was born in Rishon LeZion, Israel and he and his family moved to Sydney when he was 10. They made their first Australian home in Lane Cove, and Lior studied at Killara High School and the University of New South Wales.

Career

2000–2007: Early EP, Autumn Flow and Doorways of My Mind

In 2000, Lior released his debut extended play The Soul Suicide EP.

In October 2004, Lior recorded his debut studio album Autumn Flow. He sent it to a number of record labels but failed to secure a deal, and released the album independently, late in 2004. In 2015, Lior recalled the first time he heard a song of his on the radio station, Triple J; "I'd just done the so-called tour to launch the album but it didn't have any sort of exposure or radio play, so no-one really knew what it was. I went up and down the east coast with a band and lost all my money. I was feeling really defeated and quite sorry for myself, going 'how am I going to do this', and the song ("This Old Love") came on."
Autumn Flow made its ARIA chart debut in early 2005, peaking at number 45. Lior has toured with the WOMAD festival in 2005 to the UK, Singapore and Korea. Lior also performed at the Spiegeltent throughout the world, and the Make Poverty History concerts in Australia.

At ARIA Music Awards of 2005, the album was nominated for three awards; Breakthrough Artist, Best Male Artist, and Best Independent Release. In 2005, the album was one of the fifteen nominees for radio station triple j's inaugural J Award, given to "an album of outstanding achievement as an Australian musical work of art – for its creativity, innovation, musicianship and contribution to Australian music. 
Autumn Flow was certified gold by ARIA in 2006.

In February 2006, Lior released a live album, Doorways of My Mind, recorded at the Northcote Social Club. The album consisted mostly of tracks from Autumn Flow as well as some new material such as "Diego and the Village Girl", "Burying Chances" and "Avinu Malkeinu" (a traditional prayer). At the ARIA Music Awards of 2006, the album was nominated for two awards; Best Independent Release and Best Blues and Roots Album.

Lior moved from Sydney to Melbourne in 2007.

2008–2012: Corner of an Endless Road, Tumbling into the Dawn and Giggle and Hoot

In February 2008, Lior released his second studio album, Corner of an Endless Road. The album debuted at number 13 on the ARIA charts. At the ARIA Music Awards of 2008, the album was nominated for the Best Independent Release.

In 2008, Lior toured extensively, both in his home country of Australia and abroad including feature performances at the Edinburgh Festival. In early 2009, he performed with the Adelaide Symphony Orchestra for a series of outdoor concerts. In 2009, Lior launched the Shadows and Light Tour, a collaboration with renowned shadow artists Stephen Mushin and Anna Parry; an interactive performance combining Lior's music with live shadow art performance and featured a season at the Sydney Opera House.

In 2009, Lior was approached by children's television show Giggle and Hoot series producer Clare Gerber, and was asked to write a song. He agreed thinking "this could be fun" and wrote "Hoot's Lullaby". The song plays nightly on ABC 2 just before 7:00pm, and marks the end of children's programming on the channel for the day.

In October 2010, Lior released his third studio album Tumbling into the Dawn. The album peaked at number 26 on the ARIA charts.

In 2011 Lior wrote and recorded "Hey Hootabelle" for Giggle and Hoot. At the APRA Music Awards of 2012, the song won the APRA Award for Best Original Song Composed for Screen.

2013–2018: Compassion, Scattered Reflections and Between You and Me

In September 2013, Lior and Nigel Westlake premiered Compassion at the Sydney Opera House. Compassion is an orchestral song cycle for voice and orchestra consisting of original melodies and orchestration set to ancient texts in Hebrew and Arabic, all centred around the wisdom of compassion. The performance was recorded and the album of Compassion was released in November 2013. At the ARIA Music Awards of 2014, it won the ARIA Award for Best Classical Album. Lior premiered Compassion in the US with the Austin Symphony Orchestra in 2016 and was subsequently awarded the Austin Table Critics' Award for Best Symphonic Performance of 2015-16 and in 2016 Lior also won the Melbourne Music Prize Civic Choice Award for Compassion.

In March 2014, Lior released his fourth studio album Scattered Reflections. The album peaked at number 23 on the ARIA charts.

In April 2015, Lior was invited as the sole Australian artist to perform at the prestigious 100 year anniversary of the landing at Gallipoli, performing his song "Safety of Distance" with the Gallipoli choir leading in to the dawn service.

In June 2015, Autumn Flow was re-released as a tenth anniversary edition.

From December 2015, Lior played the part of Motel Kamzoil in Fiddler on the Roof at Melbourne's Princess Theatre.

In 2016, Lior worked with producer Tony Buchen to write an orchestral score for The Wider Earth, a Queensland theatre production based on Charles Darwin's journey on HMS Beagle. At the 2016 Matilda Theatre Awards, the music won Best Original Theatre Score.

In 2016 Lior co-wrote and recorded a children's album with The Idea of North & Elena Kats-Chernin for the HUSH Foundation. Created for the dual purpose of raising funds for the children's hospital as well as making original music to be played in the wards, the album A Piece of Quiet featured original music written to lyrics written by the children in the hospital wards and was released in October 2016. At the ARIA Music Awards of 2017, the album was nominated for ARIA Award for Best Children's Album.

Throughout 2018 Lior toured with Australian pianist and composer Paul Grabowsky in performing a collection of Lior's songs adapted and reinterpreted for piano and voice. In 2019 Lior featured as the guest vocalist for the Australian Chamber Orchestra's 'Luminous' tour which toured nationally in Australia as well as performances in the Barbican in London.

In September 2018, Lior released his fifth studio album Between You and Me.

In 2018 Lior was awarded a Fellowship of the Australian Institute of Music in recognition of outstanding achievements and services to Australian music.

2019–present: Air Land Sea and Animal in Hiding
In 2019, Lior formed the musical group Air Land Sea with Nadav Kahn and Tony Buchen. The group released four singles and a self-titled studio album across 2019.

As part of the 2021 WOMADelaide concert series, Lior performed his symphony Compassion alongside composer Nigel Westlake and the Adelaide Symphony Orchestra.

In 2021, Lior collaborated with fellow singer-songwriter Domini Forster on Animal in Hiding. Lior said "She's been my support act for awhile now, after awhile, she became the backing vocalist in my band and then leading up to my last solo album, we decided we'd have a crack at writing a song together." The EP is scheduled for released on 15 October 2021.

Philanthropy
In a 2015 interview, Lior mentioned working for the charities Cambodian Children's Trust and Global Poverty Project as well as supporting Oscar's Law.

Discography

Albums

Studio albums

Live albums

Other albums

Compilation albums

Extended plays

Singles

As lead artist
{| class="wikitable" style="text-align:center;"
|-
! scope="col"| Year
! scope="col"| Title
! scope="col" width="220"| Album
|-
| 2003
| align="left"| "Burying Chances"
| non-album single
|-
| rowspan="3"| 2005
| align="left"| "This Old Love"
| rowspan="3"| Autumn Flow
|-
| align="left"| "Daniel"
|-
| align="left"| "Autumn Flow"
|-
| 2007
| align="left"| "Heal Me"
| rowspan="2"| Corner of an Endless Road
|-
| rowspan="2"| 2008
| align="left"| "I'll Forget You" 
|-
| align="left"| "Simple Ben"  
| Morning of the Earth (soundtrack)
|-
| 2010
| align="left"| "I Thought I Could Sing On My Own" 
| 'Tumbling Into The Dawn|-
| 2011
| align="left"| "It's Only Natural"  
| They Will Have Their Way|-
| 2014
| align="left"| "My Grandfather"
| Scattered Reflections|-
| 2018
| align="left"| "Real Love" 
| Between You and Me|-
| rowspan="2"| 2021
| align="left"| "Gloria"  
| rowspan="2"| Animal in Hiding|-
| align="left"| "Honest Mistake"  
|-
|}

Awards
AIR Awards
The Australian Independent Record Awards (commonly known informally as AIR Awards) is an annual awards night to recognise, promote and celebrate the success of Australia's Independent Music sector.

|-
| rowspan="2" | 2006
|Autumn Flow  
| Best Performing Independent Album
| 
|-
| himself 
| Independent Artist of the Year
| 
|-
| rowspan="3" | 2008
| rowspan="2" |Corner of an Endless Road  
| Best Independent Album
| 
|-
| Best Independent Blues and Roots Album
| 
|-
| himself 
| Best Independent Artist
| 
|-

ARIA Music Awards
The ARIA Music Awards is an annual awards ceremony that recognises excellence, innovation, and achievement across all genres of Australian music. Lior has won two awards from nine nominations.

|-
| rowspan="3"| 2005
| rowspan="3"| Autumn Flow| Best Male Artist
| 
|-
| Breakthrough Artist - Album
| 
|-
| Best Independent Release
| 
|-
| rowspan="2"| 2006
| rowspan="2"| Doorways of My Mind| Best Blues & Roots Album
| 
|-
| Best Independent Release
| 
|-
| 2008
| Corner of an Endless Road| Best Independent Release
| 
|-
| 2014
| Compassion (with Nigel Westlake & Sydney Symphony Orchestra)
| Best Classical Album
| 
|-
| rowspan="2"| 2017
| Ali's Wedding (soundtrack) (with Nigel Westlake, Sydney Symphony Orchestra, Joseph Tawadros & Slava Grigoryan)
| Best Original Soundtrack or Musical Theatre Cast Album
| 
|-
| A Piece of Quiet (The Hush Collection, Vol 16) (with The Idea of North & Elena Kats-Chernin)
| Best Children's Album
| 

APRA Awards
The APRA Awards are held in Australia and New Zealand by the Australasian Performing Right Association to recognise songwriting skills, sales and airplay performance by its members annually. Lior has won one award from five nominations.

|-
| 2006
| "Daniel"
| Most Performed Blues & Roots Work
| 
|-
| 2009
| "Heal Me"
| Most Performed Blues & Roots Work
| 
|-
| rowspan="2"| 2012
| "Hey Hootabelle" for Giggle and Hoot, written by Lior
| Best Original Song Composed for the Screen
| 
|-
| Hootabelle| Best Music for Children's Television
| 
|-
| 2014
| Compassion 
| Work of the Year – Orchestral
| 
|-

J Award
The J Awards are an annual series of Australian music awards that were established by the Australian Broadcasting Corporation's youth-focused radio station Triple J. They commenced in 2005.

|-
| 2005
|Autumn Flow''
| Australian Album of the Year
|

References

External links
 Official web site
 

Living people
APRA Award winners
ARIA Award winners
Australian male singers
Australian people of Israeli descent
Israeli emigrants to Australia
Israeli Jews
Jewish Australian musicians
Singers from Melbourne
University of New South Wales alumni
Year of birth missing (living people)